The canton of Montlouis-sur-Loire is an administrative division of the Indre-et-Loire department, central France. Its borders were modified at the French canton reorganisation which came into effect in March 2015. Its seat is in Montlouis-sur-Loire.

It consists of the following communes:
Chambray-lès-Tours
Larçay
Montlouis-sur-Loire
Véretz
La Ville-aux-Dames

References

Cantons of Indre-et-Loire